The Ottomans laid siege to the city of Eger which launched a siege of Eger (Turkish: Eğri), that lasted from September 20 to October 12, 1596, as part of the Long War, successfully conquering it after the 7,000 defenders of the fortress, mostly foreign mercenaries, were killed by the Ottoman forces commanded by the Sultan Mehmed III himself who had arrived with the main Ottoman Army from Constantinople.

See also
 Siege of Eger (1552)

References

Conflicts in 1596
Eger
Eger
Eger
Eger
1596 in the Ottoman Empire
16th century in Hungary
Battles of the Long Turkish War
History of Heves County